Davicil is a chlorinated pyridine derivative with antimicrobial properties, which is used as a fungicide. It can be allergenic in humans and produce contact dermatitis.

References 

Pyridines
Fungicides
Sulfones
Chloroarenes